"Freestyle 4" is a song by American hip-hop artist Kanye West that features vocals from rapper Desiigner, which is from West's seventh studio album, The Life of Pablo (2016). It was remixed by Tyler, the Creator in March 2016.

Composition
The track samples the beginning of 2001 song "Human" by Goldfrapp and is heavily composed around the sample.

By the time that all of the changes had been made to The Life of Pablo in June 2016, a different instrumental popped up at the 45-second mark and more synths were added.

Remixes
On March 3, 2016, Odd Future rapper Tyler, the Creator released a remix of "Freestyle 4" titled "What the Fuck Right Now", which featured ASAP Rocky. Shortly before releasing his remix, Tyler had shown that he was a fan of the song. West tweeted out his approval of the remix three days after it was released.

LSDXOXO remixed the original on May 25, 2016, flipping it to being more suitable for the clubs. A remix of the song by Kanye West featuring ASAP Ferg and Big Sean was subject to an online leak on August 5, 2017.

Critical reception
Tom Thorogood of The Line of Best Fit viewed "Freestyle 4" as "[picking] up where Daft Punk left off on Yeezus with Kanye rapping over electro beats and Hitchcock strings". Its "dense claustrophobia" was pointed out in praise by Nosheen Iqbal of The Guardian.

Commercial performance
Upon the release of The Life of Pablo in February 2016, the track debuted at number 9 on the US Billboard Bubbling Under Hot 100. Within the same week, it reached number 43 on the US Hot R&B/Hip-Hop Songs chart.

Credits and personnel 
Credits adapted from West's official website.

Production – Kanye West
Co-production – Hudson Mohawke, Noah Goldstein for Ark Productions, Inc & Mike Dean #MWA for Dean's List Productions
Additional production – DJDS, Caroline Shaw & Trevor Gureckis
Engineering – Noah Goldstein, Andrew Dawson, Anthony Kilhoffer, Mike Dean & Tom Kahre
Mix – Manny Marroquin at Larrabee Studios, North Hollywood, CA
Mix assisted – Chris Galland, Ike Schultz & Jeff Jackson
Vocals – Desiigner

Charts

Certifications

Notes

References

2016 songs
Alternative hip hop songs
Desiigner songs
Kanye West songs
Song recordings produced by Hudson Mohawke
Song recordings produced by Kanye West
Song recordings produced by Mike Dean (record producer)
Songs written by Alison Goldfrapp
Songs written by Cyhi the Prynce
Songs written by Kanye West
Songs written by Mike Dean (record producer)
Songs written by Will Gregory